Dial Africa: The Savoy Sessions  is a compilation album by jazz musicians John Coltrane and Wilbur Harden released in 1977, featuring pieces recorded during the two 1958 sessions that produced Tanganyika Strut and Jazz Way Out.

Reception

In a review for AllMusic, Thom Jurek wrote: "Coltrane and Harden were in many ways a dream team: Coltrane's already fiery playing, which pushed bop phrasing to the seam and split it, is anchored beautifully by Harden's deeply lyrical and airy playing. They weave through one another with great balance and poise, particularly on the slightly funky title cut. Of the four sessions Coltrane and Harden recorded together, start with this one."

Track listing 
 "Dial Africa" [Take 2, Master]  (Wilbur Harden)   – 8:42
 "Anedac" (Wilbur Harden)  – 5:12
 "B.J." [Take 2] (Wilbur Harden)  – 4:56
 "B.J." [Take 3, Master] (Wilbur Harden)  – 4:32
 "Once in a While" (Michael Edwards (m) - Bud Green (w))  – 9:28
 "Oomba" (Wilbur Harden)  – 5:31

Personnel
 John Coltrane – tenor saxophone
 Wilbur Harden – trumpet, flugelhorn
 Curtis Fuller – trombone
 Tommy Flanagan – piano (#1, 6)
 Howard Williams – piano (#2–5)
 Alvin Jackson – bass
 Art Taylor – drums

References

1977 compilation albums
John Coltrane compilation albums
Savoy Records compilation albums
Wilbur Harden albums
Compilation albums published posthumously
Albums recorded at Van Gelder Studio
Albums produced by Ozzie Cadena